This uniform polyhedron compound is a symmetric arrangement of 6 decagrammic prisms, aligned with the axes of fivefold rotational symmetry of a dodecahedron.

Cartesian coordinates 
Cartesian coordinates for the vertices of this compound are all the cyclic permutations of

 (±√(τ/√5), ±2τ−1, ±√(τ−1/√5))
 (±(√(τ/√5)+τ−2), ±1, ±(√(τ−1/√5)−τ−1))
 (±(√(τ/√5)−τ−1), ±τ−2, ±(√(τ−1/√5)+1))
 (±(√(τ/√5)+τ−1), ±τ−2, ±(√(τ−1/√5)−1))
 (±(√(τ/√5)−τ−2), ±1, ±(√(τ−1/√5)+τ−1))

where τ = (1+√5)/2 is the golden ratio (sometimes written φ).

References 
.

Polyhedral compounds